Paul Marijnis (9 September 1946 – 10 April 2008) was a Dutch writer and poet.

Career

Marijnis worked as a journalist at NRC Handelsblad.

Marijnis made his literary debut in 1993 at age 47 with the novel De zeemeermin published by De Arbeiderspers. In an interview in 1993 Marijnis mentioned Paul van Ostaijen, J. Slauerhoff and Lucebert as sources of inspiration. Marijnis made his debut as poet with Gillette (1998) which was nominated for the C. Buddingh'-prijs award in 1999. His second poetry collection Roze zoenen (2002) won the very first J.C. Bloem-poëzieprijs in 2003.

Death
Marijnis died in 2008 after a stroke. His last novel Waandag was published posthumously in 2009.

Publications 

 De zeemeermin (1993)
 Gillette (1998)
 Roze zoenen (2002)
 Het licht in de kattenbak (2003)
 De loden schoentjes (2006)
 Waandag (2009)
 cumdag (2022)

References

External links 

 Paul Marijnis (in Dutch), Digital Library for Dutch Literature

1946 births
2008 deaths
Dutch male poets